Fort George Island Cultural State Park is a  Florida state park located on Fort George Island in far northeast Duval County/Jacksonville, Florida. The site was previously very near a major Timucua (Native American) center, where Spaniards founded the mission of San Juan del Puerto,  It is home to the Ribault Inn Club, constructed in 1928 as a winter resort and now used as a visitors' center for the nearby Kingsley Plantation and the island as a whole. Many weddings are held there.

Besides visiting the nearby Kingsley Plantation, other activities include off-road bicycling, hiking, boating, canoeing, kayaking, and fishing. Amenities include a -long loop bicycle trail, boat ramp, a  hiking/biking trail, and a beach. The park is open from 8:00 am until sundown year-round. There is no admission charge.

External Links
Fort George Island Cultural State Park

References

1989 establishments in Florida

 Buildings and structures in Duval County, Florida

 Florida Native American Heritage Trail

  Museums in Duval County, Florida

 Northside, Jacksonville 
Parks in Duval County, Florida

  Protected areas established in 1989

  State parks of Florida 

Timucuan Ecological and Historic Preserve